Danish Argentines are Argentine citizens of Danish ancestry or people who have emigrated from Denmark and reside in Argentina. Danish immigration to Argentina was particularly intense between the late 19th century and early 20th century. It is estimated that between 1857 and 1930 about 18,000 Danes settled in Argentina. The wave of Danish immigration to Argentina was the third largest in the world, behind those in the United States and Australia, making it one of the largest Danish communities in the world. They also include Faroese and Greenlandic Argentines because of Faroe Islands' and Greenland's status as an autonomous territory of Denmark.

Danish immigrants needed to organise their own mini societies where they could be able to preserve and to speak their own language, maintaining the familiar traditions and develop a network in the form of churches, schools, newspapers and so on. Most Danes worked as farmers and quickly became part of the Argentine labour market, but full cultural integration was possible after several generations later. Through a close-knit personal networks and institutions such as churches, schools, clubs and other associations, they retained their Danish identity and so their descendants who still to this day can be found in Argentina.

History

Around 350,000 emigrants left Denmark between 1860 and 1930. There are no official records of how many Danes came exactly to Argentina, especially before 1886. It is known that between 1886 and 1890, the arrival of 1,300 Danish immigrants was computed. Then, between 1900 and 1905, over 1,000 Danes arrived in the country, a figure that has tripled over the period 1911–1915. Since 1922, the number of arrivals decreases significantly. They settled in the province of Buenos Aires mainly in Tandil, Necochea, and in the Obera region part of the provinces of the Argentine Mesopotamia commonly called "El Litoral".

Settlement

See also
 
Argentina–Denmark relations
Finnish Argentine
Swedish Argentine

References 

Argentina